The following lists events that happened during 1967 in Denmark.

Incumbents
 Monarch – Frederick IX
 Prime minister – Jens Otto Krag

Events
June 10 – Crown Princess Margrethe marries.

Sports

Sailing
 1967 Star World Championships are held in Skovshoved.
 Paul Elvstrøm and Poul Mik-Meyer win the race.

Births
 7 January – Peter Reichhardt, actor
 7 July – Tom Kristensen, racing driver
 8 September – Peder Hvelplund, politician
 3 October – Carsten Dahl, jazz pianist
 30 October – Nikolaj Hübbe, ballet dancer, artistic director

Deaths
 31 January – Poul Henningsen, writer, architect and designer (born 1894)
 12 May – Henry Nielsen, actor (born 1890)
 24 June – Kai Normann Andersen, composer (born 1900)
 16 September – Gerhard Henning, Swedish-Danish sculptor (born 1880)
 21 October – Ejnar Hertzsprung, chemist and astronomer (born 1873)

See also
1967 in Danish television

References

 
Denmark
Years of the 20th century in Denmark
1960s in Denmark
Denmark